

The Arsenal VG 70 was a single-seat monoplane research aircraft flown in France shortly after World War II to assist in the development of high-speed jet fighters. Lacking an indigenous turbojet engine, the aircraft was fitted with a German Junkers Jumo 004. Unlike most jet-powered aircraft of the period, the swept wing was wooden as was the tail structure. The under-powered VG 70 made its maiden flight in 1948, but only flew five times before the program was terminated the following year.

Development and description
Jean Galtier, chief designer at Arsenal de l'Aéronautique, decided to build a turbojet-powered research aircraft in late 1945. He wished to investigate the aerodynamics of swept wings at high speeds to take advantage of captured German data to better understand how they might impact future fighter designs. Its all-metal fuselage was derived from the VG-30 prewar series of piston-engined fighters and Galtier took advantage of the company's experience of wooden construction to build the wing and empennage out of wood. The leading edge of the shoulder-mounted wing was swept back at an angle of 43° and the wing itself was given a dihedral of 6°. Seven fuel tanks were housed in the two-spar wing and dive brakes were positioned on its upper surface. The main wheels of the tricycle landing gear retracted into the wings while the nose gear retracted into the lower part of the nose.

The Jumo 004 turbojet, captured from the Germans, had  of thrust. It was positioned in the aft fuselage, together with three additional fuel tanks, and used air provided by a prominent semi-circular ventral intake underneath the cockpit.

Construction and flight testing
Construction of the aircraft was completed in 1947 and it had begun taxiing tests in October, but wind-tunnel testing revealed some potential aerodynamic problems that delayed its first flight by over six months. It finally flew on 23 June 1948 and achieved a speed of  despite its unreliable engine. The program was cancelled in early 1949 after only five flights as the engine's lack of thrust imposed tight limits on the types of test flying that it could do and Arsenal had refocused on the follow-on VG 90 carrier-based fighter.

Variants
VG 70
Research aircraft powered by a Jumo 004 turbojet, one built
VG 71
Research aircraft with a Rolls-Royce Derwent 5 turbojet, proposal only.
VG 80
Carrier-based fighter aircraft powered by a Rolls-Royce Nene turbojet, never built, but developed into the VG 90.

Specifications

See also

References

Bibliography

 

VG 70
1940s French experimental aircraft
Single-engined jet aircraft
High-wing aircraft